The Sinclair Executive was the world's first "slimline" pocket calculator, and the first to be produced by Clive Sinclair's company Sinclair Radionics. Introduced in 1972, there were at least two different versions of the Sinclair Executive, with different keyboard markings, and another called the Sinclair Executive Memory, introduced in 1973.

Its small size was made possible by pulsing the current to the Texas Instruments TMS1802 "calculator on a chip" integrated circuit, reducing the power consumption by a factor of more than 10.  The Executive was highly successful, making  of profit for Sinclair and winning a Design Council Award for Electronics.

History
The Executive was launched in September 1972 at the price of  plus VAT, equivalent to £ in  when adjusted for inflation. This was around half the price of comparable calculators, but still twice the average weekly wage. It was the first pocket calculator, and the first to be mass-produced, and its introduction to the market coincided with a number of other companies entering the calculator market.

Clive Sinclair, reckoning that the market for "executive toys" was not especially sensitive to price, ordered components for 100,000 calculators. The Executive was highly successful, and made 1.8 million pounds profit for Sinclair Radionics. It was well received by both domestic and foreign markets, and  worth of Executives were sold in Japan in early 1974 at six times the price of Japanese models. The Executive impressed the engineers at Texas Instruments, who had used the same chip to produce a longer and wider calculator that was over three times as thick and a great deal more expensive.

A Sinclair Executive purchased by a Russian diplomat exploded in his breast pocket, allegedly leading to an official Soviet investigation. It was found that it had been left on by accident, leading to a current drain on the batteries that overheated them until they burst.

Design
It was significantly smaller than any of its competitors, and the first calculator that could easily be carried in a pocket. According to a Sinclair executive quoted in the Financial Times, "one must always bear a packet of cigarettes in mind as the ideal size," possibly a quip on Clive Sinclair's smoking habit. The case, designed by Iain Sinclair, was made of black injection-moulded polycarbonate and required flexible glue to hold the two halves together.

Design Magazine described it as "at once a conversation piece, a rich man's plaything and a functional business machine".  One Executive is on display at the Museum of Modern Art in New York City, and the futuristic design earned it the Design Council Award for Electronics in 1973. It was the first calculator designed for aesthetic appeal, and New Scientist described it as "not so much a professional calculator - more a piece of personal jewellery".

Functions
As well as four-function arithmetic, the Executive had the ability to compute squares, reciprocals, and multiply or divide by a fixed constant. The Executive could carry out sums to two, four or six decimal places, or use a floating decimal point.

Microprocessor
The calculator was powered by a Texas Instruments TMC1802NC, a metal oxide semiconductor integrated circuit with 7000 transistors. This CPU normally consumes 350 milliwatts, but by pulsing the power this requirement was reduced to 20 milliwatts. It was discovered that an early prototype continued to work if the batteries were disconnected and then reapplied quickly enough, as the capacitors in the circuit could hold a charge for up to five seconds.

Power is supplied to the chip in 1.7 microsecond pulses as determined by the storage time of a control transistor. An oscillator clock operating at 200 kilohertz during calculations and dropping to 15 kilohertz between each operation means shut off time ranges from 3.3 microseconds during calculations to over 65 microseconds between. The device relies on the capacitance of the chips to store information when there is no power, and 1.7 microseconds proved sufficient for the chip to carry out a single change of state of the electronics. Any calculation can be done in 1000 such changes. This had the effect of extending battery life to about 20 hours of continuous use with three small hearing aid batteries, equivalent to about four months of normal usage.

Screen
The screen on the Executive was a monolithic seven-segment gallium arsenide light emitting diode display, bought from a Canadian firm. The small screen reduced the power consumption and material costs, but it was revised several times in pursuit of lower power consumption, creating issues with reliability.

Executive Memory
The Executive Memory was launched in November 1973, with the same dimensions as the original, but with the ability to memorise subtotals from any number of chain calculations. There were at least three versions, including the black and white Type 1, and the Type 2 with a gold keyboard.

References

Further reading
 
 

English inventions
Sinclair calculators